Holl and Höll are surnames that may refer to:

 Adolf Holl (1930–2020), Austrian Roman Catholic writer and theologian
 Diane Holl (born 1964), British motor racing engineer
 Edwin Holl (1916–2005), American politician
 Elias Holl (1573–1646), German architect
 Francis Holl (1815–1884), English engraver, son of William Holl the Elder
 Frank Holl (1845–1888), English painter
 Gussy Holl (1888–1966), German actress and singer
 Hartmut Höll (born 1952), German pianist and music professor
 Harvey Buchanan Holl (1820–1886), British surgeon and naturalist
 John Holl (1802–1869), Prince Edward Island politician 
 Justin Holl (born 1992), American hockey player 
 Karl Holl (1866–1926), German professor of theology and church history
 Nicolas Josef Eugene Holl (1855–c. 1919), French entomologist
 Robert Holl (born 1947), Dutch opera singer
 Steven Holl (born 1947), American architect
 Ursula Holl (born 1982), German football player and coach
 Werner Holl (born 1970), German pole vaulter
 William Holl the Elder (1771–1838), English engraver
 William Holl the Younger (1807–1871), English engraver, son of Willi

Fictional
 the title character of Dr. Holl, a 1951 West German film

See also
 
 
 Hall (disambiguation),